National Road 10 (also known as Risti-Virtsu-Kuivastu-Kuressaare maantee; Risti-Virtsu-Kuivastu-Kuressaare highway) begins from Risti and branches off from the T9.
The Risti-Virtsu-Kuivastu-Kuressaare highway is the only national route to include a ferry crossing (between Muhu island and Estonian mainland). The road passes through Lääne and Saare County. The highway ends in Kuressaare on the intersection of the T76, T77 and T10.

Route
The total length of the road is 143.7 km. For its entire length, the road is 1+1.
The Suur Väin Strait is crossed by a regular Virtsu-Kuivastu ferry, while Väike Väin Strait is crossed via a causeway Väinatamm.
During winter an ice road connects Muhu with the mainland.

See also
 Transport in Estonia

References

External links

N10